Hugo is a crater on Mercury. Its name was adopted by the International Astronomical Union in 1979. Hugo is named for the French writer Victor Hugo, who lived from 1802 to 1885.

The crater is highly eroded and difficult to distinguish.

To the west of Hugo is Velázquez crater.  To the east are Sōseki and Plath.

References

Impact craters on Mercury
Victor Hugo